Maryland's Legislative District 34 is one of 47 districts in the state for the Maryland General Assembly. It covers part of Harford County. The district is divided into two sub-districts for the Maryland House of Delegates: District 34A and District 34B.

Demographic characteristics
As of the 2020 United States census, the district had a population of 130,756, of whom 100,673 (77.0%) were of voting age. The racial makeup of the district was 79,968 (61.2%) White, 31,304 (23.9%) African American, 466 (0.4%) Native American, 4,377 (3.3%) Asian, 72 (0.1%) Pacific Islander, 3,894 (3.0%) from some other race, and 10,605 (8.1%) from two or more races. Hispanic or Latino of any race were 9,281 (7.1%) of the population.

The district had 89,715 registered voters as of October 17, 2020, of whom 19,265 (21.5%) were registered as unaffiliated, 30,008 (33.4%) were registered as Republicans, 38,955 (43.4%) were registered as Democrats, and 822 (0.9%) were registered to other parties.

Political representation
The district is represented for the 2023–2027 legislative term in the State Senate by Mary-Dulany James (D) and in the House of Delegates by Steven C. Johnson (D, District 34A), Andre Johnson Jr. (D, District 34A) and Susan K. McComas (R, District 34B).

Election history

Election results, 1986-present

Senate

References

Harford County, Maryland
34